Seyyed Hamid (also Romanized as Seyyed Ḩamīd; also known as Maḩall-e Eḩdās̄-e Rūstāy-e Seyyed Ḩamīd) is a village in Esmailiyeh Rural District, in the Central District of Ahvaz County, Khuzestan Province, Iran. At the 2006 census, its population was 38, in 8 families.

References 

Populated places in Ahvaz County